Qinghe District, previously named as Qinghe Township before the 1980s, is a district of Tieling City.

Sightseeings
Qinghe Dam

Administrative Divisions
There are two subdistricts, two town, and one ethnic township within the district.

Subdistricts:
Xiangyang Subdistrict, Hongqi Subdistrict

Towns:
Zhangxiang, Yangmulinzi

The only township is Niejia Manchu Ethnic Township

Education
There are two elementary schools, one junior high school and one senior high school in the main area.
No.1 Elementary School of Qinghe District

No.2 Elementary School of Qinghe District

Qinghe Experimental High School

Qinghe High School

References

External links

1.  Government Homepage

 
County-level divisions of Liaoning
Tieling